In enzymology, a glutamate-putrescine ligase is an enzyme that catalyzes the chemical reaction

ATP + L-glutamate + putrescine  ADP + phosphate + gamma-L-glutamylputrescine

The 3 substrates of this enzyme are ATP, L-glutamate, and putrescine, whereas its 3 products are ADP, phosphate, and gamma-L-glutamylputrescine.

This enzyme belongs to the family of ligases, specifically those forming carbon-nitrogen bonds as acid-D-ammonia (or amine) ligases (amide synthases).  The systematic name of this enzyme class is L-glutamate:putrescine ligase (ADP-forming). Other names in common use include gamma-glutamylputrescine synthetase, and YcjK.  This enzyme participates in urea cycle and metabolism of amino groups.

References

 

EC 6.3.1
Enzymes of unknown structure